Cameronians may refer to:

 Cameronian group, a seventeenth-century religious group in Scotland named for its leader, Richard Cameron
 26th (Cameronian) Regiment of Foot, a regiment of the British Army raised from among the Cameronians, in existence from 1689 to 1881
 Cameronians (Scottish Rifles), a regiment of the British Army formed from the 26th Foot in 1881, and disbanded in 1968

See also
 Cameroonian (disambiguation)